Harrison Gray Otis may refer to:

Harrison Gray Otis (publisher) (1837–1917), publisher of the Los Angeles Times
Harrison Gray Otis (politician) (1765–1848), American businessman, lawyer, and politician
 SS Harrison Gray Otis, Liberty ship, commissioned and sunk in 1943

See also
Harrison Gray Otis Dwight (1803–1862), American Congregational missionary
Harrison G. O. Blake (1818–1876), U.S. Representative from Ohio
Harrison Gray Otis House, in Boston, Massachusetts